Tulleys Farm  is a fourth-generation  family farm, located in West Sussex. Originating in 1937, the farming business at Tulleys was founded by Bernard Beare, and continues to be run by the Beare family to this day. Tulleys is best known for its seasonal attractions, most notably the annual Halloween festival held each October, entitled Shocktober Fest which has become the largest scream park in Europe.

History
Originally from Devon, Bernard Beare began farming in 1911 and gradually moved East over the subsequent 25 years. In 1937 he settled at Worth Hall Farm, working with his young family to turn an ordinary dairy farm into a successful farming enterprise. In addition to the original dairy herd, Bernard was able to produce salad crops for the London markets, vegetables for pickling firms such as Epicure and herbs like mint and parsley for contract.

In the early 1970s, Bernard's son Denis saw the potential for pick-your-own and, with his wife Marion, pursued turning Tulleys Farm into one of the largest pick-your-own farms in the area. Growing over 40 different crops on 120 acres.

Following Stuart, the son of Denis and Marion, joining the farming business in 1991, the farm shop and tearoom were opened in 1992 and 1996 respectively, the farm shop closed in 2014. The farm shop re-opened in March 2020 but this time in the form of a drive thru.

In 2004 the farm was awarded 'Farm Retailer of the Year' by the National Farmers Union.

Reluctant to label himself a ‘conventional farmer’, Stuart’s devotion to creating an experience for his customers has led to the establishment of seasonal events. Stuart’s son Sam joined the business in 2017.

Events 
Tulleys Farm currently hosts three seasonal events, taking place in summer, autumn and winter. As well as the Tulleys tea room and Escape rooms which are open all year round.

Tulleys Escape Rooms & Games 
Tulleys Escape Rooms are live challenge rooms in which customers have 60 minutes to try and escape, aided by the help of attraction hosts, who give clues over speakers inside the room. There is currently 4 rooms to choose from and a further 2, smaller and easier game rooms in a nearby trailer.

The Outfitters – Set in 1926 Chicago, in the midst of crime (Difficulty: 4).
Mutiny – Set in 1672 the golden age of Piracy (Difficulty: 3).
Nethercott Manor - Set in an old manor house and its gardens (Difficulty: 5).
Dodge City - A wild west themed escape room (Difficulty: 4)

In December 2019 two new escape games were introduced UNCLE TICK-TOCK'S CIRCUS & KRAKEN CASINO the two escape games are both an hour long, aimed at beginners, fun, simple and contained in just one room

Tulleys Maze 
In 1998, Tulleys Farm was host to its first maze, created by artist Adrian Fisher.

Open from mid July until early September, Tulleys Maze is the farm’s main summer event, centered around an eight acre Maize field which is transformed into a challenging maze. In addition to the Giant Maize Maze there are numerous giant games, mini mazes, tractor rides, giant slides, and attractions such as the Secret Forest, Farmers Golf and Straw Mountain. Towards the end of the Maze period Torch Nights also take place, giving visitors the opportunity to complete the maze in the dark.

The maze did not open in the summer of 2018 and was instead replaced with the re-introduction of pick you own to Tulleys Farm in the form of Pumpkins. This was met with great excitement with ITV London broadcasting the weather live from the fields.

Shocktober Fest 

Shocktober Fest is the Halloween event held yearly at Tulley’s Farm. It offers a total of 10 haunts, including Wastelands Penitentary, Twisted Clowns 3D, The Chop Shop Garage and The Horrorwood Haunted Hayride. The event additionally offers a variety of live music and freshly prepared food. It is known to be Europe’s largest Scream Park. Shocktober Fest is attracting over 100,000 guests every year.

Tulleys Christmas 
The farm holds Christmas experience for the winter season, which consists of a real ice rink, Santa sleigh ride and a number of other traditional farm activities such as Reindeer food making and gingerbread decorating.

Shocktober Fest attractions
Current Mazes

Creepy Cottage (1998–Present)

Horrorwood Hayride (2002–Present)

The Cellar (2009–Present)

Twisted Clowns (2009–Present)

HELL-ELEMENTS - previously VIXI (2011–Present)

Chop Shop (2015–Present)

Coven Of 13 (2016–Present)

Circus Of Horrors (2018–Present)

Wastelands Penetentiary (2019–Present)

The Island (2021-Present)

Previous Mazes

The Wreckening (2019–2020)

Field Of Screams (2005-2011)

Dr Plagues Maze (2013-2014)

The Tunnel (2014-2015)

Colony (2015-2018)

The Volt (2015-2016)

References 

Farms in England
Family-owned companies of England
Tourist attractions in Sussex
1937 establishments in England